The Next Generation Jammer is a program to develop an airborne electronic warfare system, as a replacement for the AN/ALQ-99 found on the EA-18G military aircraft. It will reach Initial Operating Capability in 2021.

Platforms
The AN/ALQ-99 is currently mounted on the EA-18G Growler aircraft of the U.S. Navy and the Royal Australian Air Force, as well as the now-retired EA-6B Prowler aircraft belonging to the U.S. Marine Corps.

In the primary role of suppression of air defenses, these aircraft are to provide modified escort jamming from outside the range of known surface to air missiles.

History
The poor reliability of the ALQ-99 and frequent failures of the Built In Test (BIT) have caused crew to fly missions with undetected faults. The ALQ-99 also interferes with the aircraft's AESA radar, reduces the top speed of the aircraft and imposes a high workload on the two man crew.

The United States Marine Corps is considering replacing their Northrop Grumman EA-6B Prowler electronic attack aircraft with F-35s that have stealthy jammer pods attached. In September 2008, the United States Navy outlined the basic requirements of the NGJ and stated that the design must be modular and open.  The Navy selected four companies to submit designs for the Next Generation Jammer. The NGJ will have cyber attack capabilities where the AESA radar is used to insert tailored data streams into remote systems. 

The ITT-Boeing design for the NGJ includes six AESA arrays for all around coverage.  The team was awarded a $42 million contract to develop their design based on ITT's experience with broadband electronically steerable antenna arrays. At the same time contracts were also awarded to Raytheon, Northrop Grumman and BAE Systems.

After having existing jamming platforms thinly stretched over three wars during Operation Odyssey Dawn, the Navy accelerated the NGJ program and anticipated a vendor selection in 2013 instead of 2015 as previously planned.

All contractors bidding for the program included Active Electronically Scanned Array technology in their plans.

The Office of Naval Research has started a Next-Generation Airborne Electronic Attack (NGAEA) project to develop technologies for the NGJ.

The system was expected to be fielded (on the Growler) by 2020, but budget cuts pushed IOC to 2021, and now to 2022 for the Mid Band pod. Tom Burbage of Lockheed Martin has said that the NGJ would be carried by his company's F-35 in 2022 or 2023. Marine Corps Commandant Gen. James Amos has said that unlike previous generations of aircraft, the base EW systems in the standard F-35 will allow it to just attach the pods and perform the mission, without having to make a special electronic warfare version of the F-35.

In July 2013 it was announced by Navair that the $279 million Technical Development (TD) phase of the contract had been awarded to Raytheon Space and Airborne Systems. On 26 July 2013, the Navy issued Raytheon a stop-work order, following a formal protest of the contract by BAE Systems. In December 2013, the Government Accountability Office upheld the protest, claiming they found that the Navy used improper procedures to select Raytheon.  The Navy examined the issue and continued with Raytheon.

In 2013 Boeing invested their own funds in a series of upgrades that they believe will be needed for the Growler to field the NGJ.

After a successful System Readiness Review in June 2014, Raytheon expects to move forward with flight testing in September 2014 and an IOC of late 2020. The test was flown in November 2014. The pod operates independently of the aircraft's systems, automatically responding to identified threats.  One unique aspect of the NGJ is that its AESA array combines EW, coms, radar, and signals intelligence. AESA is known to perform EW and radar, but also handling SIGINT and serving as a communications array are new capabilities.  Other than dedicated EW aircraft, the pods can be installed on other platforms like the UCLASS with little modification.

The Royal Australian Air Force is contributing $250 million towards the NGJ program, and is directly participating in its development.

The first flight test of the mid-band (MB) version of the pod took place in August 2020 aboard an EA-18G out of Naval Air Station Patuxent River in Maryland. This flight was intended to prove that the pod could be safely flown aboard the EA-18G. Initial Operating Capability is expected on the MB pod in FY 2022, with a Capability Block 1 contract to be awarded in the fall of 2020. The mid-band and then the low-band pods will supplement the legacy jamming system on the Growlers until the high-band, the last of the three increments, is fielded and the legacy system can be safely retired.

See also
 Civil Aircraft Missile Protection System 
 Electronic countermeasures

Related ECMs
 AN/ALQ-128
 AN/ALQ-144
 AN/ALQ-99
 Sky Shield

References

External links
 BAE Systems
 Northrop Grumman
 Raytheon
 ITT / Boeing

Electronic countermeasures
Military electronics of the United States